Mr Noon is an unfinished novel by the English writer D. H. Lawrence. It appears to have been drafted in 1920 and 1921 and then abandoned by the author. It consists of two parts.

The first part was published  posthumously by Secker as a long short story in the 1934 volume A Modern Lover. This fragment was reissued in 1968 in the Phoenix II collection of Lawrence's assorted writings. It is set in the East Midlands, where the author was born and spent his youth. The second fragment was finally published along with the introductory section in 1984 and describes the experiences of the main character during his elopement to the continent.

The book is characterised by a flippant, sarcastic tone as Lawrence reflects on the sexual behaviour and attitudes of provincial men and women in the period before the First World War.

Reception 
The biographer Brenda Maddox writes that Mr. Noon provides a new perspective on D. H. Lawrence's relationship with Frieda Lawrence, and that its second half is "a factually accurate and barely fictionalized account of Lawrence and Frieda's early sexual relations." According to Maddox, the critic Diana Trilling viewed the book as "biographical fact", and was so shocked by what it revealed about Frieda's sexual behaviour that she accused Lawrence of "artistic dishonesty."

Standard edition 

 Mr Noon (1920?) - Parts I and II, edited by Lindeth Vasey, Cambridge University Press, 1984,

References 

1934 British novels
English novels
Novels published posthumously
Novels by D. H. Lawrence
Unfinished novels
Cambridge University Press books